Malaysia competed at the 2018 Commonwealth Games in the Gold Coast, Australia from 4 to 15 April 2018. Squash Racquets Association of Malaysia (SRAM) president Huang Ying How was the chef-de-mission of the delegation.

Track and field athlete Muhammad Hakimi Ismail was the country's flag bearer during the opening ceremony.

Competitors
The following is the list of number of competitors participating at the Games per sport/discipline.

Medalists

Athletics

Men
Track & road events

Field events

Women
Track & road events

Field events

 Q: Qualified by Place
 q: Qualified by Time
 : No Mark

Badminton

Malaysia badminton team consisted of ten athletes (five male and five female).

Individual

Doubles

Mixed team

Roster

Chan Peng Soon
Soniia Cheah
Chow Mei Kuan
Goh Liu Ying
Goh Soon Huat
Goh V Shem
Vivian Hoo
Shevon Jemie Lai
Lee Chong Wei
Tan Wee Kiong

Pool D

Quarterfinal

Semifinal

Final

Basketball

Malaysia qualified a women's basketball team of 12 athletes. The team was invited by FIBA and the CGF.

Women's tournament

Roster

Pool B

Cycling

Malaysia participated with 14 athletes (11 men and 3 women).

Track
Sprint

Keirin

Time trial

Pursuit

Points race

Scratch race

Diving

Malaysia participated with a team of 13 athletes (7 men and 6 women).

Men

Women

Hockey

Men's tournament

Roster

Norsyafiq Sumantri
Muhamad Ramadan Rosli
Mohd Fitri Saari
Joel Samuel van Huizen
Faizal Saari
Syed Mohamad Syafiq Syed Cholan
Mohamad Sukri Abdul Mutalib
Muhammad Firhan Ashari
Muhammad Amirol Aideed Mohd Arshad
Nabil Fiqri Mohd Noor
Muhammad Razie Abd Rahim
Muhammad Azri Hassan
Meor Muhamad Azuan Hassan
Muhammad Hafizuddin Othman
Tengku Ahmad Tajuddin Tengku Abdul Jalil
Muhammad Najmi Farizal Jazlan
Muhammad Shahril Saabah
Muhammad Hairi Abd Rahman

Pool B

Fifth and sixth place

Women's tournament

Roster

Farah Ayuni Yahya
Nuraini Abdul Rashid
Nuraslinda Said
Nurul Nabihah Mansur
Raja Norsharina Raja Shabuddin
Siti Noor Amarina Ruhani
Juliani Mohamad Din
Norbaini Hashim
Norazlin Sumantri
Hanis Nadiah Onn
Surizan Awang Noh
Nur Syafiqah Mohd Zain
Mas Huzaimah Md Aziz
Siti Rahmah Othman
Fazilla Sylvester Silin
Wan Norfaiezah Md Saiuti
Fatin Shafika Mohd Sukri
Nuramirah Shakirah Zulkifli

Pool A

Seventh and eighth place

Gymnastics

Artistic
Malaysia participated with 6 athletes (2 men and 4 women).

Men
Individual Qualification

Individual Finals

Women
Team Final & Individual Qualification

Individual Finals

Rhythmic
Malaysia participated with 3 athletes (3 women).

Team & Individual Qualification

Individual Finals

Lawn bowls

Malaysia will compete in Lawn bowls.

Men

Women

Rugby sevens

Men's tournament

Malaysia qualified a men's rugby sevens team of 12 athletes, by being the second highest ranked Commonwealth nation at the 2017 Asia Rugby Sevens Series.

Roster

Wan Ismail
Mohammad Safwan Abdullah
Muhammad Zulhisham Rasli
Muhammad Siddiq Jalil
Nik Mohd Zain
Mohamad Khairul Ramli
Zulkiflee Azmi
Muhammad Zharif Affandi
Muhammad Ameer Zulkeffli
Muhammad Azwan Mat Zizi
Muhammad Nasharuddin Ismail
Muhamad Firdaus Tarmizi

Pool A

Shooting

Malaysia participated with 9 athletes (6 men and 3 women).

Men

Women

Squash

Malaysia participated with 9 athletes (5 men and 4 women).

Individual

Doubles

  :Walkover

Swimming

Malaysia participated with 7 athletes (5 men and 2 women).

Men

Women

Table tennis

Malaysia participated with 8 athletes (4 men and 4 women).

Singles

Doubles

Team

Para-sport

Triathlon

Malaysia participated with 2 athletes (1 man and 1 woman).

Individual

Weightlifting

Malaysia participated with 10 athletes (6 men and 4 women).

Men

Women

Powerlifting

Malaysia participated with 2 athletes (2 men).

See also
Malaysia at the 2018 Summer Youth Olympics

References

Nations at the 2018 Commonwealth Games
Malaysia at the Commonwealth Games
2018 in Malaysian sport